Ambassis jacksoniensis, commonly known as the Port Jackson glassfish or Port Jackson perchlet, is a species of fish in the family Ambassidae native to eastern Australia. It gains its common name from its transparent appearance.

Taxonomy
William John Macleay described the Port Jackson glassfish as Pseudambassis jacksoniensis in 1881 from a specimen collected in Port Jackson, noting that the length was three and a third times the fishes' height. The species name relates to the location it was described. It was classified in the new genus Velambassis by Gilbert Whitley in 1935, on the basis of having weaker dorsal spines than other members of the family.  Allen and Burgess found no reason for the species not to be in the genus Ambassis and reassigned it there in 1990.

This species and the co-occurring estuary glassfish (A. marianus) are the only two members of the genus found in temperate waters. The others are found in the waters of northern Australia and southeast Asia.

Description
It has a short deeply-notched dorsal fin and forked tail fin. It is slimmer than the related A. marianus—its body depth is 33 to 38% of standard length compared to the latter species' body depth of 37 to 44% of standard length. The Port Jackson glassfish also has a lateral line running the length of its body, while that of its relative is partial.

Distribution and habitat
The Port Jackson glassfish is native to coastal eastern Australia, from Moreton Bay in Queensland through to Narooma in southern New South Wales. It lives in estuaries and protected brackish tidal streams that have mangroves growing along the margins.

Feeding
The Port Jackson glassfish feeds on zooplankton, foraging from the water surface to the substrate. It is a food item of the little pied and little black cormorants.

References

Port Jackson glassfish
Freshwater fish of Australia
Port Jackson glassfish
Taxa named by William John Macleay